Igreja da Ordem Terceira do Carmo  is a church located in São Paulo, Brazil. Established in 1592, the current church dates to 1929.

References

Roman Catholic churches in São Paulo
1592 establishments in South America
Churches completed in 1929